Sanjibani is a Bengali drama film directed by Sukumar Dasgupta. This movie was released on 1 January 1952 under the banner of M. P. Productions Pvt. Ltd. This movie starring Uttam Kumar, Reba Devi, Jahar Ganguly, Jiben Bose and Sandhya Rani in the lead roles.

Cast
 Uttam Kumar
 Reba Devi
 Sandhya Rani
 Dhiraj Das
 Gurudas Bandyopadhyay
 Jahar Ganguly
 Jiben Bose
 Kanu Banerjee 
 Padma Devi
 Probha Debi

References

External links
 

1952 films
Bengali-language Indian films
1952 drama films
1950s Bengali-language films
Indian drama films